José Arturo Sánchez Méndez (born 26 August 1996) is a Dominican footballer who plays as a forward for Atlántico FC and the Dominican Republic national team.

International career
Sánchez made his international debut on 30 August 2016, when he entered as an 88th-minute substitute in a win friendly against Puerto Rico.

References

External links
LaPreferente profile

1996 births
Living people
Dominican Republic footballers
Divisiones Regionales de Fútbol players
Dominican Republic international footballers
Dominican Republic expatriate footballers
Dominican Republic expatriate sportspeople in Spain
Association football midfielders
Association football forwards